The Dutch Reformed Church in Africa (DRCA; , NGKA) was a Reformed denomination in South Africa. It was a mission church of the Dutch Reformed Church in South Africa (NGK) exclusively for black people, formed in 1963 during the apartheid era. Originally it was mainly in the Free State and northern Transvaal.

In 1994 it united with the Dutch Reformed Mission Church (DRMC) – a similar denomination for coloured people – to form the Uniting Reformed Church in Southern Africa.

References

Dutch Reformed Church in South Africa (NGK)
Reformed denominations in Africa
Protestantism in South Africa
Calvinist denominations established in the 20th century
Christian organizations established in 1963
1963 establishments in South Africa
1994 disestablishments in South Africa